The Pinnacle, also Pinnacle Towers, is a building on hold in Nairobi, the capital and largest city of Kenya.

Location

Overview
The development consists of two adjacent towers. The shorter tower, at 46 floors will house the 257-room, five-star Upper Hill Hilton Hotel, the third Hilton franchise in Nairobi and the 50th on the African continent. The taller tower, with 70 floors, will feature eleven floors of commercial office space, nine floors of upscale rental retail space, and 46 floors with 210 upscale 1, 2 and 3-bedroom, serviced residential apartments. Other amenities include conference facilities, a gymnasium, luxury spa and an infinity pool.

Ownership
The development is a joint venture by Hass Petroleum an East African petroleum products distributor and the White Lotus Group, a Dubai-based investment firm. The White Lotus Conglomerate is run by Indian businessman and godman Vijaykumar Naidu, otherwise known as Kalki Bhagwan. Helping him run the business are his son N.K.V. Krishna and daughter-in-law Preetha Krishna.

Construction and funding
The budgeted construction cost for the Pinnacle Towers is US$200 million. Of that, the developers contributed US$50 million and the balance was borrowed, from Afreximbank and some Kenyan banks. The main contractor is China State Construction Engineering Corporation (CSCEC). Commissioning of the building is expected in 2020.

Delays and land ownership dispute
A dispute has arisen over ownership of part of the land being used for construction. The High Court has issued arrest warrants for the directors of White Lotus Projects, Poosapati Ramachandra Raju Sita and Mohamud Mahat Noor. The dispute began when legal action was taken against Hass Petroleum by Ugandan tycoon James Mugoya and a trust formed by former United Arab Emirates leader Sheikh Zayed Bin Sultan Al Nahyan.

See also
 List of tallest buildings in Kenya

References

Buildings and structures in Nairobi
Nairobi
Skyscraper office buildings in Kenya